Hokke can refer to:
 Hokke, a cadet branch of the Japanese Fujiwara family
 The fish Okhotsk atka mackerel

For temples, see Hokke-ji (disambiguation).